Hillsboro Airport , also known as Portland–Hillsboro Airport, is a corporate, general aviation and flight-training airport serving the city of Hillsboro, in Washington County, Oregon, United States. It is one of three airports in the Portland, Oregon, metropolitan area owned and operated by the Port of Portland. Established in 1928, it is Oregon's second busiest airport (in terms of total aircraft operations) at over 200,000 operations annually.

Located in the north-central area of Hillsboro, and west of Portland, it hosts the annual Oregon International Air Show. The airport includes a Federal Aviation Administration control tower, three paved runways, hangars, fueling facilities, and a small passenger terminal. Hillsboro Airport is also a port of entry, with a single-person U.S. Customs and Border Protection office.

History
Hillsboro airport goes back to 1928. Dr. Elmer H. Smith purchased  of land near the town to use as an airport, as he owned the first airplane in town. In the early 1930s, after Smith died, the city purchased the airport for $7,500 and received a federal grant to improve the facilities.

In July 1936, Richard Evelyn Byrd's "Stars And Stripes" Fairchild FC-2 aircraft used to explore the South Pole was displayed at the airport.

With the outbreak of World War II in 1941, the city received federal money again, and the city approved local financing to improve the airport again, with the costs of the improvements totaling around $600,000.

During and after flooding along the Columbia River in 1948, the Hillsboro facility was used by some commercial operators due to the closure of then Portland-Columbia Airport (now Portland International), which lies along the river. The three commercial carriers at Hillsboro were Coastal Airways, Columbia Air Cargo, and General Air Cargo. This was the flooding that wiped out the city of Vanport, and due to that disaster relief supplies were flown into the Portland area by the United States Air Force using the Hillsboro Airport.

The field was also considered as a possible naval air station in 1946 and again in 1955, but was eventually rejected by the Navy.

In early 1960 several companies were located at the airport, including Tektron Instruments and Georgia Pacific.

In 1964, the Hillsboro City Council made an official request to the Port of Portland to take over ownership of the airport. The facility had deteriorated due to inadequate funding, and the Port agreed to take over ownership after some legal wrangling in 1965

On August 28, 1966, an air traffic control tower was opened after construction costs of $400,000 with staffing by the FAA. In April 1975 the current main terminal that includes offices and a restaurant opened, followed by the opening of the new  runway on September 1, 1976.

The airport received scheduled regular airline service during the late 1970s, on Farwest Airlines to Boeing Field in Seattle, Washington, as well as to Medford and North Bend/Coos Bay airports.

In 1989, customs call out service was added to allow international business flights at the airport after lobbying by Congressman Les AuCoin and business leaders. After advance notice, customs inspectors from Portland would be sent to the airport to process the passengers.

Hillsboro Airport is often mentioned as a reliever airport for Portland International Airport. In 1999, Portland City Council member Dan Saltzman suggested expanding the Hillsboro Airport to relieve pressure on the busy Portland International Airport. This was during a time when the Port of Portland was discussing building a new larger airport or possibly adding a third runway to PDX to handle growing demand for air travel and air cargo. Saltzman suggested shifting some commercial flights to Hillsboro, while shifting some cargo flights there had previously been discussed.

As of 2006, the Port of Portland planned to spend $134 million through 2025 to improve the Hillsboro facility. Plans call for a third runway, increased hangar space, and additional automobile parking on-site, among other items. Construction on the third runway was to begin as early as 2010, but legal challenges put the plan on hold. In 2007, a staffed customs office was added to the airport. Paid for by funds generated by a user-fee association, this allowed the airport to continue as a port of entry, and removed the need for a Customs officer to travel from Portland International Airport.

The airport handled 259,263 flights in 2008, surpassing Portland International in this category. In 2009, the airport received a grant from the U.S. Department of Transportation to expand taxiways as part of the airport's master plan. President Barack Obama landed at the airport in Marine One in February 2011 as part of a visit to nearby Intel. The Port spent $9 million to repave the 2/20 runway and combined two taxiways into a single one in 2013. Construction started on the third runway in June 2014. Nike founder Phil Knight built a personal hangar at the airport next to the Nike hangar in 2014, while Global Aviation added a new hangar that same year. The third runway was eventually built, opening in April 2015.

On July 3, 2017 a man climbed a perimeter fence near Hillsboro Aero Academy and attempted to steal a Robinson R22 helicopter.  After a brief chase with police he was fatally shot.

Operations
 

Located in Portland's western and Washington County suburbs, Hillsboro Airport is connected to the metropolitan area by TriMet buses and the MAX Blue Line's Fair Complex/Hillsboro Airport station. The transit station is located to the south of the airport, across the Westside Commons (formerly the Washington County Fairgrounds). The primary public access point, including to the terminal building, is from Cornell Road, on the south side of the airport.

Facilities include a  runway (Rwy 13R/31L), a  runway (rwy 2/20), a  runway (rwy 13L/31R), and an FAA control tower. Runway 13R/31L is ILS- and PAPI-equipped. The air traffic control tower is staffed from 6 a.m. to 10 p.m. local time. The tower receives a radar feed from the Falls City ARSR to supplement radio communication and binoculars to locate aircraft in its airspace. The small main terminal includes two rental car companies, KUIK-AM radio station, airport offices, and a waiting area for the passengers flying on the daily Intel charter flights. There is also a single-officer-staffed U.S. Customs and Border Protection office to process international flights.

The airport was originally Hillsboro's municipal airport, which the Port of Portland bought in 1966. It has been developed to support all forms of general aviation and is home to four fixed-base operator (FBOs). Many people, including celebrities, politicians and sports-stars choose to use Hillsboro for its ease and discreetness. The airport is also a hub for many major local corporations, including Nike, Teufel Nursery, and Intel. The predominant activity at the airport is flight training, accounting for more than half of the overall operations. It was formerly the base of operation for the Life Flight Network, the medical evacuation provider for the region. Operated by Oregon Health & Science University, Legacy Health System, and Providence Health System, the non-profit service owns one helicopter and two fixed-wing aircraft.

As of 2005, the airport handled 223,000 takeoffs and landings. It is Oregon's second-busiest airport overall after Portland International, and is the largest general aviation airport in the state. The annual Oregon International Air Show takes place at Hillsboro Airport.

Training
 ATP Flight School
 Hillsboro Aero Academy

Incidents

 A Horizon Air plane was hijacked on May 2, 1986, en route from Eugene to Portland, with the pilot able to convince the hijacker to allow the plane to land at HIO where the hijacker was arrested.
 On February 11, 2022, a Cessna 205 landed safely after suffering a complete engine failure during a flight from Seattle to Sacramento. The emergency descent and air traffic control exchanges were captured on the pilot's cockpit-mounted GoPro camera.

See also

 Pearson Field
 Portland-Mulino Airport
 Portland-Troutdale Airport

References

External links

Hillsboro Airport Master Plan
Hillsboro Aviation, Inc.

U.S. Customs and Border Protection User Fee Airport Facility Contact Info Fee Info Location

Airports in Washington County, Oregon
Airports established in 1928
Transportation in Hillsboro, Oregon
Port of Portland (Oregon)
1928 establishments in Oregon